A Patriot for Me is a 1965 play by the English playwright John Osborne, based on the true story of Alfred Redl. The controversial refusal of a performance licence by the Lord Chamberlain's Office played a role in the passage of the Theatres Act 1968.

The play depicts Redl, a homosexual in the Austro-Hungarian intelligence service in the 1890s, as he is blackmailed by the Russians into a series of treasonous betrayals. The play highlights the dangers that a non-conformist faces in a declining empire. Its dramatic climax, and the scene that most excited the censor, is the Drag Ball, in which members of the upper echelons of Viennese society appear in drag. Mary McCarthy, the American novelist, wrote in The Observer that the play's "chief merit is to provide work for a number of homosexual actors, or normal actors who can pass as homosexual". A Patriot for Me remains rarely performed because of the large cast required.

When the Royal Court Theatre produced A Patriot For Me in 1965, it was forced to change from a public theatre to a private members' club. The play was deemed too sexually transgressive by the Lord Chamberlain's Office, and denied a licence for performance. The Royal Court suffered a considerable financial loss because of this denial.

George Devine, founder of the English Stage Company, was performing in this play when he died of a heart attack.

A musical adaptation of A Patriot for Me, with music by Laurence Rosenthal, was produced on Broadway in 1969. The play was an influence on the later film Colonel Redl.

Awards and honors

Original Broadway production

References

1965 plays
Plays by John Osborne